Mariana Arceo (born 25 April 1994) is a Mexican modern pentathlete. She represented Mexico at the 2019 Pan American Games in Lima, Peru and she won the gold medal in the women's individual event.

She represented Mexico at the 2020 Summer Olympics in Tokyo, Japan. She competed in the women's event.

At the 2019 World Modern Pentathlon Championships in Budapest, Hungary, she won, with Mayan Oliver, the gold medal in the women's relay event.

References

External links 

Living people
1994 births
Mexican female modern pentathletes
World Modern Pentathlon Championships medalists
Central American and Caribbean Games silver medalists for Mexico
Central American and Caribbean Games medalists in modern pentathlon
Competitors at the 2018 Central American and Caribbean Games
Modern pentathletes at the 2019 Pan American Games
Medalists at the 2019 Pan American Games
Pan American Games medalists in modern pentathlon
Pan American Games gold medalists for Mexico
Sportspeople from Guadalajara, Jalisco
Olympic modern pentathletes of Mexico
Modern pentathletes at the 2020 Summer Olympics
21st-century Mexican women